Fagin is a surname. Notable people with the name include:

 Betsy Fagin (born 1972), American poet
 Claire Fagin (born 1926), American nurse, educator, academic and interim university president
 Dan Fagin (born 1963), American journalist
 Joe Fagin (born 1940), British pop singer-songwriter
 Joe Fagin (baseball), American Major League Baseball catcher in 1895
 Larry Fagin (1937 – 2017), American poet, editor, publisher, and teacher
 Lucas Fagin (born 1980), Argentinian composer
 Ronald Fagin (born 1945), American mathematician and computer scientist

See also
Fagan, surname
Fagen, surname